Cartoon Party is a Canadian children's television series which aired on CBC Television from 1959 to 1962.

Premise
Malcolm the Dog (a puppet by John Keogh) presented various cartoons.

Scheduling
For the first two seasons, this half-hour series was broadcast on Saturdays at 5:30 p.m. (Eastern) from 7 November to 25 March 1961, with a break between January and April 1960. From 4 April 1961, Cartoon Party moved to a Tuesday 5:30 p.m. time slot where the series then ran during mid-years in 1961 and 1962.

References

External links
 
 

CBC Television original programming
1950s Canadian children's television series
1960s Canadian children's television series
1959 Canadian television series debuts
1962 Canadian television series endings
Black-and-white Canadian television shows
Canadian television series with live action and animation
Canadian television shows featuring puppetry